The Kefauver House is a historic house at 224 West Cherry Street in Rogers, Arkansas.  Built around 1920 by local businessman W. E. Kefauver,  this 1½ story wood-frame structure exemplifies the Bungalow style, with a broad porch supported by tapered square columns, and an arched architrave highlighting the opening where the stairs lead upward.  It has hip roof with wide overhangs, and a broad shallow-pitch gabled dormer on the front facade.

The house was listed on the National Register of Historic Places in 1988.

See also
National Register of Historic Places listings in Benton County, Arkansas

References

Houses on the National Register of Historic Places in Arkansas
Houses completed in 1920
Houses in Rogers, Arkansas
National Register of Historic Places in Benton County, Arkansas